KOWA-LP (106.5 FM) was a radio station licensed to Olympia, Washington, United States. The station was last owned by Media Island International, a not for profit public library and resource and networking center. KOWA-LP was a member of the Pacifica Radio Network.

KOWA 106.5 LP FM created their own independent media for broadcast on other stations such as this interview with the 22nd Pastors for Peace Cuba Caravanistas in Olympia, Washington on July 6, 2011 and this talk about the Attacks on LGBTQ Community & Unions In Honduras on March 8, 2013.

The Federal Communications Commission cancelled KOWA-LP's license on October 18, 2021.

References

External links
Official KOWA-LP Website
Listen to the KOWA-LP live stream
Official KOWA-LP info from Media Island International
Pacifica Radio Network page about KOWA-LP.
 

Radio stations in Olympia, Washington
Low-power FM radio stations in Washington (state)
Radio stations established in 2003
2003 establishments in Washington (state)
Radio stations disestablished in 2021
2021 disestablishments in Washington (state)
Defunct radio stations in the United States
OWA-LP